Ashmore Township is one of twelve townships in Coles County, Illinois, USA.  As of the 2010 census, its population was 1,364 and it contained 605 housing units.

Geography

Cities, towns, villages
 Ashmore

Extinct towns
 Embarrass
Hitesville

Cemeteries
The township contains these ten cemeteries: Ashmore, Brooks, Enon, Lafler, Miller, Patsy Mitchell, Reed, Saint Omer, Shoot and Zimmerman.

Major highways
  Illinois Route 16
  Illinois Route 49

Airports and landing strips
 John R Reed Airport

Demographics

School districts
 Casey-Westfield Community Unit School District 4c
 Charleston Community Unit School District 1
 Kansas Community Unit School District 3
 Oakland Community Unit School District 5

Political districts
 Illinois' 15th congressional district
 State House District 110
 State Senate District 55

References
 
 United States Census Bureau 2007 TIGER/Line Shapefiles
 United States National Atlas

External links
 City-Data.com
 Illinois State Archives

Adjacent townships 

Townships in Coles County, Illinois
Populated places established in 1859
Townships in Illinois
1859 establishments in Illinois